Hapigia obliqua is a moth of the  family Notodontidae.

Notodontidae